was the 14th Governor-General of Taiwan (1931–1932). He was Governor of Fukushima Prefecture (1913–1915), Ishikawa Prefecture (1915–1916), Kumamoto Prefecture (1916–1919), Niigata Prefecture (1919–1923) and Aichi Prefecture (1923–1924). He was a graduate of the University of Tokyo.

1871 births
1951 deaths
Governors of Fukushima Prefecture
Governors of Ishikawa Prefecture
Governors of Kumamoto Prefecture
Governors of Niigata Prefecture
Governors of Aichi Prefecture
Governors-General of Taiwan
People of the Kwantung Leased Territory
Japanese colonial governors and administrators
University of Tokyo alumni